Derviş Mehmed Zillî (25 March 1611 – 1682), known as Evliya Çelebi, was an Ottoman explorer who travelled through the territory of the Ottoman Empire and neighboring lands over a period of forty years, recording his commentary in a travelogue called the Seyâhatnâme ("Book of Travel"). The name Çelebi is an honorific title meaning "gentleman" or "man of God" (see pre-1934 Turkish naming conventions).

Life 
 
Evliya Çelebi was born in Constantinople in 1611 to a wealthy family from Kütahya. Both his parents were attached to the Ottoman court, his father, Derviş Mehmed Zilli, as a jeweller, and his mother as an Abkhazian relation of the grand vizier Melek Ahmed Pasha. In his book, Evliya Çelebi traces his paternal genealogy back to Ahmad Yasawi, an early Sufi mystic. Evliya Çelebi received a court education from the Imperial ulama (scholars). He may have joined the Gulshani Sufi order, as he shows an intimate knowledge of their khanqah in Cairo, and a graffito exists in which he referred to himself as Evliya-yı Gülşenî ("Evliya of the Gülşenî").

A devout Muslim opposed to fanaticism, Evliya could recite the Quran from memory and joked freely about Islam.  Though employed as a clergyman and entertainer at the Imperial Court of Sultan Murad IV Evliya refused employment that would keep him from travelling. Çelebi had studied vocal and instrumental music as a pupil of a renowned Khalwati dervish by the name of 'Umar Gulshani, and his musical gifts earned him much favor at the Imperial Palace impressing even the chief musician Amir Guna. He was also trained in the theory of music called . 

His journal-writing began in Constantinople, with the taking of notes on buildings, markets, customs and culture, and in 1640 it was augmented  with accounts of his travels beyond the confines of the city. The collected notes of his travels form a ten-volume work called the Seyahatname ("Travelogue"). Departing from the Ottoman literary convention of the time, he wrote in a mixture of vernacular and high Turkish, with the effect that the Seyahatname has remained a popular and accessible reference work about life in the Ottoman Empire in the 17th century, including two chapters on musical instruments.

Evliya Çelebi died in 1684, it is unclear whether he was in Istanbul or Cairo at the time.

Travels

Europe 
Çelebi claimed to have encountered Native Americans as a guest in Rotterdam during his visit of 1663. He wrote: "[they] cursed those priests, saying, 'Our world used to be peaceful, but it has been filled by greedy people, who make war every year and shorten our lives.'"

While visiting Vienna in 1665–66, Çelebi noted some similarities between words in German and Persian, an early observation of the relationship between what would later be known as two Indo-European languages.

Çelebi visited Crete and in book II describes the fall of Chania to the Sultan; in book VIII he recounts the Candia campaign.

Croatia 
During his travels in South Slavic regions of the Ottoman Empire Çelebi visited various regions of the modern-day Croatia including northern Dalmatia, parts of Slavonia, Međimurje and Banija. He recorded variety of historiographic and ethnographic sources. They included descriptions of first hand encounters, third party narrator witnesses and invented elements.

Circassia 
Çelebi traveled to Circassia as well, in 1640. He commented on the women's beauty and talked about the absence of mosques and bazaars despite being a Muslim country. He talks about the hospitality of Circassians and mentions that he could not write the Circassian language using letters, and compared the language to a "magpie shout".

Bosnia 

Evliya Çelebi visited the town of Mostar, then in Ottoman Bosnia. He wrote that the name Mostar means "bridge-keeper", in reference to the town's celebrated bridge, 28 meters long and 20 meters high. Çelebi wrote that it "is like a rainbow arch soaring up to the skies, extending from one cliff to the other. ...I, a poor and miserable slave of Allah, have passed through 16 countries, but I have never seen such a high bridge. It is thrown from rock to rock as high as the sky."

Kosovo 
In 1660 Çelebi went to Kosovo and referred to the central part of the region as Arnavud (آرناوود) and noted that in Vučitrn its inhabitants were speakers of Albanian or Turkish and few spoke Bosnian. The highlands around the Tetovo, Peć and Prizren areas Çelebi considered as being the "mountains  of  Arnavudluk". Çelebi referred to the "mountains of Peć" as being in Arnavudluk (آرناوودلق) and considered the Ibar river that converged in Mitrovica as forming Kosovo's border with Bosnia. He viewed the "Kılab" or Lab river as having its source in Arnavudluk (Albania) and by extension the Sitnica as being part of that river. Çelebi also included the central mountains of Kosovo within Arnavudluk.

Albania 
Çelebi travelled extensively throughout Albania, visiting it on 3 occasions. He visited Tirana, Lezha, Shkodra and Bushat in 1662, Delvina, Gjirokastra, Tepelena, Skrapar, Përmet, Berat, Kanina, Vlora, Bashtova, Durrës, Kavaja, Peqin, Elbasan, Pogradec, Kavaja and Durrës in 1670.

Parthenon 
In 1667  Çelebi expressed his marvel at the Parthenon's sculptures and described the building as "like some impregnable fortress not made by human agency."  He composed a poetic supplication that the Parthenon, as "a work less of human hands than of Heaven itself, should remain standing for all time."

Asia

Shirvan 
Of oil merchants in Baku Çelebi wrote: "By Allah's decree oil bubbles up out of the ground, but in the manner of hot springs, pools of water are formed with oil congealed on the surface like cream. Merchants wade into these pools and collect the oil in ladles and fill goatskins with it, these oil merchants then sell them in different regions. Revenues from this oil trade are delivered annually directly to the Safavid Shah."

Crimean Khanate 
Evliya Çelebi remarked on the impact of Cossack raids from Azak upon the territories of the Crimean Khanate, destroying trade routes and severely depopulating the regions. By the time of Çelebi's arrival, many of the towns visited were affected by the Cossacks, and the only place in Crimea he reported as safe was the Ottoman fortress at Arabat.

Çelebi wrote of the slave trade in the Crimea:

Çelebi estimated that there were about 400,000 slaves in the Crimea but only 187,000 free Muslims.

Syria and Palestine 
In contrast to many European and some Jewish travelogues of Syria and Palestine in the 17th century, Çelebi wrote one of the few detailed travelogues from an Islamic point of view. Çelebi visited Palestine twice, once in 1649 and once in 1670–1.  An English translation of the first part, with some passages from the second, was published in 1935–1940 by the self-taught Palestinian scholar Stephan Hanna Stephan who worked for the Palestine Department of Antiquities.
Significant are the many references to Palestine, or "Land of Palestine", and Evliya notes, "All chronicles call this country Palestine."

Seyâhatnâme

Although many of the descriptions the Seyâhatnâme were written in an exaggerated manner or were plainly inventive fiction or third-source misinterpretation, his notes remain a useful guide to the culture and lifestyles of the 17th century Ottoman Empire. The first volume deals exclusively with Istanbul, the final volume with Egypt.

Currently there is no English translation of the entire Seyahatname, although there are translations of various parts. The longest single English translation was published in 1834 by Joseph von Hammer-Purgstall, an Austrian orientalist: it may be found under the name "Evliya Efendi."  Von Hammer-Purgstall's work covers the first two volumes  (Istanbul and Anatolia)  but its language is antiquated. Other translations include Erich Prokosch's nearly complete translation into German of the tenth volume, the 2004 introductory work entitled The World of Evliya Çelebi: An Ottoman Mentality written by Robert Dankoff, and Dankoff and Sooyong Kim's 2010 translation of select excerpts of the ten volumes, An Ottoman Traveller: Selections from the Book of Travels of Evliya Çelebi.

Evliya is noted for having collected samples of the languages in each region he traveled in. There are some 30 Turkic dialects and languages cataloged in the Seyâhatnâme. Çelebi notes the similarities between several words from the German and Persian, though he denies any common Indo-European heritage. The Seyâhatnâme also contains the first transcriptions of many languages of the Caucasus and Tsakonian, and the only extant specimens of written Ubykh outside the linguistic literature. He also wrote in detail about Arabian horses and their different strains.

In the 10 volumes of his Seyahatname, he describes the following journeys:

 Constantinople and surrounding areas (1630)
 Anatolia, the Caucasus, Crete and Azerbaijan (1640)
 Syria, Palestine, Armenia and Rumelia (1648)
 Kurdistan, Iraq, and Iran (1655)
 Russia and the Balkans (1656)
 Military Campaigns in Hungary during the fourth Austro-Turkish War (1663/64)
 Austria, the Crimea, and the Caucasus for the second time (1664)
 Greece and then the Crimea and Rumelia for the second time (1667–1670)
 the Hajj to Mecca (1671)
 Egypt and the Sudan (1672)

In popular culture

 Çelebi appears in Orhan Pamuk's 1985 novel The White Castle, and is featured in The Adventures of Captain Bathory (Dobrodružstvá kapitána Báthoryho) novels by Slovak writer Juraj Červenák.
 İstanbul Kanatlarımın Altında (Istanbul Under My Wings, 1996) is a film about the lives of legendary aviator brothers Hezârfen Ahmed Çelebi and Lagâri Hasan Çelebi, and the Ottoman society in the early 17th century, during the reign of Murad IV, as witnessed and narrated by Evliya Çelebi.
 Evliya Çelebi ve Ölümsüzlük Suyu (Evliya Çelebi and the Water of Life, 2014, dir. Serkan Zelzele), a children's adaptation of Çelebi's adventures, is the first full-length Turkish animated film.
 UNESCO included the 400th anniversary of Çelebi's birth in its timetable for the celebration of anniversaries.
 In the 2015 TV series Muhteşem Yüzyıl: Kösem, is portrayed by Turkish actor Necip Memili.

See also
Ahmad ibn Fadlan
Hezârfen Ahmed Çelebi
Kâtip Çelebi
Abbas ibn Firnas
Evliya Çelebi Way
Turkish literature

References

Sources and further reading

In Turkish

 Evliya Çelebi. Evliya Çelebi Seyahatnâmesi. Beyoğlu, İstanbul: Yapı Kredi Yayınları Ltd. Şti., 1996. 10 vols.
 Evliya Çelebi: Seyahatnamesi. 2 Vol. Cocuk Klasikleri Dizisi. Berlin 2005.  (A selection translated into modern Turkish for children)
 Robert Dankoff, Nuran Tezcan, Evliya Çelebi'nin Nil Haritası - Dürr-i bî misîl în ahbâr-ı Nîl, Yapı Kredi Yayınları 2011
 Nuran Tezcan, Semih Tezcan (Edit.), Doğumunun 400. Yılında Evliya Çelebi, T.C. Kültür ve Turizm Bakanlığı Yayınları, Ankara 2011

In English 

  (+ contents) + via Hathi Trust
  (+ contents)

 Narrative of travels in Europe, Asia, and Africa, in the seventeenth century, by Evliyá Efendí. Trans. Ritter Joseph von Hammer. London: Oriental Translation Fund of Great Britain and Ireland, 1846.
 
 Evliya Çelebi in Diyarbekir: The Relevant Section of The Seyahatname. Trans. and Ed. Martin van Bruinessen and Hendrik Boeschoten. New York : E.J. Brill, 1988.
 The Intimate Life of an Ottoman Statesman: Melek Ahmed Pasha (1588–1662) as Portrayed in Evliya Çelebi's Book of Travels. Albany: State University of New York Press, 1991.
 Evliya Çelebi's Book of Travels. Evliya Çelebi in Albania and Adjacent Regions (Kosovo, Montenegro). The Relevant Sections of the Seyahatname. Trans. and Ed. Robert Dankoff. Leiden and Boston 2000. 
 Robert Dankoff: An Ottoman Mentality. The World of Evliya Çelebi. Leiden: E.J. Brill, 2004.
 Klaus Kreiser, "Evliya Çelebi", eds. C. Kafadar, H. Karateke, C. Fleischer. October 2005.

 Evliya Çelebi:  Selected Stories by Evliya Çelebi, edited by Zeynep Üstün, translated by Havva Aslan, Profil Yayıncılık, Istanbul 2007

In German

 Helena Turková: Die Reisen und Streifzüge Evliyâ Çelebîs in Dalmatien und Bosnien in den Jahren 1659/61. Prag 1965.
 Klaus Kreiser: Edirne im 17. Jahrhundert nach Evliyâ Çelebî. Ein Beitrag zur Kenntnis der osmanischen Stadt. Freiburg 1975. 
 Im Reiche des Goldenen Apfels. Des türkischen Weltenbummlers Evliâ Çelebis denkwürdige Reise in das Giaurenland und die Stadt und Festung Wien anno 1665. Trans. R. Kreutel, Graz, et al. 1987.
 Ins Land der geheimnisvollen Func: des türkischen Weltenbummlers, Evliyā Çelebi, Reise durch Oberägypten und den Sudan nebst der osmanischen Provinz Habes in den Jahren 1672/73. Trans. Erich Prokosch. Graz: Styria, 1994.
 Evliyā Çelebis Anatolienreise aus dem dritten Band des Seyāḥatnāme. Trans. Korkut M. Buğday. New York: E.J. Brill, 1996.
 Evliya Çelebis Reise von Bitlis nach Van: ein Auszug aus dem Seyahatname. Trans. Christiane Bulut. Wiesbaden: Harrassowitz, 1997.
 Manisa nach Evliyā Çelebi: aus dem neunten Band des Seyāḥat-nāme. Trans. Nuran Tezcan. Boston: Brill, 1999.
 Kairo in der zweiten Hälfte des 17. Jahrhunderts. Beschrieben von Evliya Çelebi. Trans. Erich Prokosch. Istanbul 2000.

External links

 Ottoman text edition (1896)

1611 births
1682 deaths
Explorers of Asia
17th-century writers from the Ottoman Empire
17th-century explorers
People from the Ottoman Empire of Abkhazian descent
17th-century travel writers
Turkish travel writers
Holy Land travellers
Explorers of the Caucasus
Travelers in Asia Minor
People from Istanbul